The Stokes operators are the quantum mechanical operators corresponding to the classical Stokes parameters. These matrix operators are identical to the Pauli matrices .

External links
  Stokes operators, angular momentum and radiation phase.
Quantum mechanics